This article lists the openings of lines, line segments, stations and fare schemes of the Shanghai Metro, a rapid transit system serving Shanghai, China, and one of the fastest-growing metro systems in the world. The first section opened in 1993, and the system currently has  of track in operation, making it one of the world's largest rapid transit systems by route length and second largest by number of stations.

Timeline of line openings
 May 28, 1993 – Southern section of line  ( – ) enters operation (4 stations).
 April 10, 1995 – Two segments on line  enter operation ( –  (1 station) and  – ) (8 stations), extending line  at both ends (9 stations). Total length: , 13 stations.
 December 28, 1996 – Southern extension to line  ( – ) enters operation (3 stations). Total length: , 16 stations.
 September 20, 1999 – Line  ( – ) enters operation (12 (11 new) stations). Total length: , 28 stations (1 interchange; 27 unique).
 December 27, 2000 – An extension and a new line enters operation (20 (17 new) stations):
 The eastern extension to line  ( – ) enters operation (1 station);
 Line  ( – ) enters operation (19 (16 new) stations). Total length: , 48 stations (4 interchange; 44 unique).
 November 25, 2003 – Line  ( – ) enters operation (11 (10 new) stations). Total length: , 59 stations (5 interchange; 54 unique).
 December 28, 2004 – Northern extension to line  ( – ) enters operation (9 stations). Total length: , 68 stations (5 interchange; 63 unique).
These nine stations are not counted twice in the total number of stations. Total length: , 81 stations (8 interchange; 73 unique).
 December 18, 2006 – Northern extension to line  ( – ) enters operation (10 stations). Total length: , 91 stations  (8 interchange; 83 unique).
 December 30, 2006 – Western extension to line  ( – ) enters operation (4 stations). Total length: , 95 stations (8 interchange; 87 unique).
 December 29, 2007 – Two extensions and three new lines or sections ( opens as interchange station on lines 4 and 8) enter operation on the same day (66 (61 new) stations):
 Second northern extension to line  ( – ) enters operations (3 stations);
 Delayed section of line  ( – ), completing the loop, enters operations (4 stations);
 Line  ( – ) enters operation (27 (25 new) stations);
 Line  ( – ) enters operation, except China Art Museum station (20 (18 new) stations);
 Line  ( – ) enters operations (12 stations). Total length: , 161 stations (11 interchange; 148 unique).
Total length: , 162 stations (11 interchange; 148 unique).
 July 5, 2009 – Southern extension to line  ( – ) enters operation, except Oriental Sports Center station (8 stations). Total length: , 170 stations (11 interchange; 156 unique).
 December 5, 2009 – Line  ( – ) enters operation, except  station (26 (19 new) stations). Total length: , 196 stations (18 interchange; 175 unique).
 December 31, 2009 – An extension and a new line enters operation (25 (19 new) stations):
 The downtown section of line  ( – ) enters operations (9 (5 new) stations);
 First section of line  ( – ) enters operations, except Chenxiang Highway station (16 (14 new) stations). Total length: , 221 stations (23 interchange; 194 unique).
 February 24, 2010 – Short section of eastern extension of line  ( – ) enters operation (2 stations).  station is rebuilt underground. Total length: , 223 stations (23 interchange; 196 unique).
 March 16, 2010 – Second western extension to line  ( – ) enters operation, except Hongqiao Railway Station station (2 stations), connecting Hongqiao Airport to the metro system. Total length: , 225 stations (23 interchange; 198 unique).
 March 29, 2010 – Branch line of line  ( – ) enters operation, except East Changji Road station (3 stations). Total length: , 228 stations (23 interchange; 201 unique).
 April 7, 2010 - The section - opens on line  (1 station). Total length: , 229 stations (23 interchange; 202 unique).
 April 8, 2010 – Eastern extension to line  ( – ) enters operation (8 stations), connecting the two airports. Total length: , 237 stations (23 interchange; 210 unique).
 April 10, 2010 – Line  ( – ) enters operation (27 (21 new) stations). Shanghai Metro becomes the longest metro system in the world after 15 years of breakneck growth. Total length: , 264 stations (29 interchange; 231 unique).
 April 20, 2010 – A temporary line and an infill station enters operation (4 (3 new) stations):
 Expo section of line  ( – ) enters temporary operation (3 (2 new) stations);
 Houtan station on line  opens (1 station). Total length: , 268 stations (30 interchange; 234 unique).
 July 1, 2010 – with the opening of Hongqiao railway station, its metro station of the same name on line  enters operation (1 station). Total length: , 269 stations (30 interchange; 235 unique).
 November 2, 2010 – With the end of the Shanghai Expo, the Expo section of line  suspends service, to be reopened when the rest of the line is completed (-3 stations). Total length:, 266 stations (29 interchange; 233 unique).
 November 30, 2010 – Branch section of line  ( – ) enters operation (4 (2 new) stations), connecting the two terminals of Hongqiao Airport. Total length: , 270 stations (31 interchange; 235 unique).
 December 28, 2010 – The northern extension to line  ( – ) enters operation, except ,  and Qihua Road station (3 stations). Total length: , 273 stations (31 interchange; 238 unique).
 April 12, 2011 – An interchange station Oriental Sports Center station opens adding an infill station on line  and extending line  ( — ) extends (1 station).Allowing the Shanghai Metro to reach , 275 stations (32 interchange; 239 unique).
 April 26, 2011 – Line  East Changji Road station opens (1 station). Total length: , 276 stations (32 interchange; 240 unique).
 June 30, 2011 – Panguang Road station and Liuhang station on line  open (2 stations). Total length: , 278 stations (32 interchange; 242 unique).
 September 28, 2012 – China Art Museum station on line  opens (1 station). Total length: , 279 stations (32 interchange; 243 unique).
 December 30, 2012 – An extension and a new line enters operation (8 (7 new) stations):
 The southern extension of line  ( – ) enters operation (3 stations);
 The first phase of line  ( – ) enters operation, except South Qilianshan Road station and Daduhe Road station (5 (4 new) stations). Total length: , 287 stations (33 interchange; 250 unique).
 June 15, 2013 – South Qilianshan Road station on line  opens (1 station). Total length: , 288 stations (33 interchange; 251 unique).
 August 31, 2013 – The second phase of line  ( – ) enters operation, except  (12 (9 new) stations). Total length: , 300 stations (34 interchange; 260 unique).
 October 16, 2013 – The branch extension of line  ( – ) enters operation (3 stations). Shanghai Metro is extended into Jiangsu province, and becomes the first inter-provincial Chinese rapid transit system and second intercity system after the Guangfo Metro. Total length: , 303 stations (34 interchange; 263 unique).
 December 29, 2013 – Two new lines enter operation (26 (22 new) stations):
 The eastern section of line  ( – ) enters operation (15 (12 new) stations);
 Line  ( – ) enters operation (11 (10 new) stations). Shanghai’s subway network retook the title of longest in the world. Total length: , 329 stations (38 interchange; 285 unique).
 May 10, 2014 – Line  extension ( - ) (1 (0 new) station). Total length: , 330 stations (39 interchange; 285 unique).
 July 22, 2014 – Qihua Road station on line  opens (1 station). Total length: , 331 stations (39 interchange; 286 unique).
 November 1, 2014 – Daduhe Road station on line  opens (1 station). Total length: , 332 stations (39 interchange; 287 unique).
 December 28, 2014 – Two extensions enter operation (5 (2 new) stations):
 Extension to line  ( – ) enters operation (3 (1 new) stations);
 Extension to line  ( – ) enters operation (2 (1 new) stations). Total length: , 337 stations (41 interchange; 289 unique).
 December 19, 2015 – Three extensions enter operation (27 (14 new) stations):
 Extension to line  ( – ) enters operation (2 stations);
 Extension to line  ( – ) enters operation (16 (7 new) stations);
 Extension to line  ( – ) enters operation (9 (5 new) stations).  Total length: , 364 stations (51 interchange; 303 unique).
 April 26, 2016 – Extension to line  ( - ) enters operation (1 station). Total length: , 365 stations (51 interchange; 304 unique).
 December 30, 2017 – An extension and a new line enters operation (22 (20 new) stations):
Total length: , 387 stations (52 interchange; 324 unique).
 March 31, 2018 – Pujiang line ( – ) enters operation (6 (5 new) stations). Total length: , 393 stations (53 interchange; 329 unique).
 December 30, 2018 – Two extensions enters operation (20 (16 new) stations):
 Extension to line  ( – ) enters operation (8 stations);
 Extension to line  ( – ) enters operation (12 (8 new) stations). Total length: , 413 stations (57 interchange; 345 unique).
 August 25, 2020 – Chenxiang Highway station on line  opens (1 station). Total length: , 414 stations (57 interchange; 346 unique).
 December 26, 2020 – An extension and a new line enters operation (14 (12 new) stations):
 Extension to line  ( – ) (6 (5 new) stations);
 Line  ( – ) opens (8 (7 new) stations).Total length: , 428 stations (59 interchange; 358 unique).
 January 23, 2021 – Line  ( - ) enters operation, except Guilin Road station (29 (23 new) stations). Shanghai retook the title of longest metro system in the world. Total length: , 457 stations (64 interchange; 381 unique).
 June 27, 2021 – Guilin Road station on line  opens (1 (0 new) station), making the station an interchange station with line . Total length: , 458 stations (65 interchange; 381 unique).
 December 30, 2021 – An extension and a new line ( opens as interchange station on lines 14 and 18) enters operation (48 (27 new) stations):
 Line  ( – ) except Longju Road station opens (30 (18 new) stations);
 Extension to line  ( – ) (18 (10 new) stations).Total length: , 506 stations (83 interchange; 408 unique).

Timeline of Shanghai metro construction by lines

Name change of Shanghai metro lines
In the Master Plan of Shanghai Metro-Region 1999–2020 the name of subway lines was subdivided in three categories:
 R: Regional route (connecting the suburbs to the city center)
 M: Municipal route (connecting to the central city)
 L: Light rail (less passenger capacity than the subway, as a supplement to the subway)

On 14 January 2003 it was announced that the naming of rail transit lines will be unified to Rail Transit Line 1, Line 2, and Line N.

Timeline of Shanghai Metro fare scheme

Trial openings sightseeing fare scheme
 April 1993 line 1 (Xinlonghua - ) trial operation for sightseeing to the public: fare 5 yuan.
 December 1994 line 1 ( - ) trial operation for sightseeing to the public: fare 4 yuan.
 September 1999 line 2 trial operation for sightseeing to the public: fare 5 yuan. In 2000 the second ticket was free (buy one, get one free).

Line specific fares
 Line 1: 
 At the official opening in April 1995, the approved fare scheme was 2, 4, and 6 yuan, but a discounted fare scheme of 1, 2, and 3 yuan was implemented. The plan was to return to the approved fare scheme at end of the year.
 December 1995: Instead of returning to the approved fare scheme, due to extensive public pressure, a single fare of 2 yuan was implemented (length of line 1 was 15.71 kilometers/13 stations at the time).
 At the opening of the southern extension in December 1996, this section ( – Jinjiang Paradise) operated independently with a fare of 1 yuan.
 On July 1, 1997 (as through operations at Jinjiang Paradise were established) the line introduced a two-level segment fares of 2 yuan (13 stops or less) and 3 yuan (14 stops or more). 
 On March 1, 1999, the fare increased with 1 yuan (i.e. 3 yuan (13 stops or less) and 4 yuan (14 stops or more)). Shanghai Metro line 1 opened an automatic ticket collection system (using an American system), using one-way tickets (magnetic cards) and stored-value tickets (IC cards), and the original paper tickets were discontinued.
 In August 2000 the fare scheme of line 1 was changed to the unified fare scheme.
 Line 2: 
 At the official opening in May 2000 the fare of line 2 is 2 yuan for 0 to 6 kilometers; 3 yuan for 6 to 16 kilometers; more than 16 kilometers, the fare increases by 1 yuan for every additional 6 kilometers. From opening line 2 used magnetic card one-way ticket, and the magnetic card stored-value ticket and the contactless smart card stored-value ticket which can be used on metro lines 1 and 2.
 In August 2000 the fare scheme of line 2 was changed to the unified fare scheme.
 To ease the traffic pressure in the tunnel, line 2 launched a special price of 1 yuan for crossing the river (within 3 stops) between August 10, 2000 and November 1, 2001, and then the number of passengers increased exponentially.  
 Line 3: 
 From opening in December 2000 preferential fares were implemented, with 2 yuan for the ride below 9 stops, and 3 yuan for the ride with more than 10 stops. 
 From November 1, 2003, the unified fare scheme was implemented. Paper tickets on line 3 were discontinued. The ticket collection system used the Indra system from Spain, which was incompatible with the ticket system of lines 1 and 2.
 Line 5: 
 From opening in 2003 a reduced fare is 2 yuan for journeys under 6 km and all other journeys on the line were 3 yuan (though the total length of this section is a bit longer than 16 km), originally implemented to cultivate passenger flow.
 In December 2005 paper tickets were discontinued. The unified fare scheme was implemented for rides not exclusively on line 5 (rides exclusively on line 5 kept their reduced fare).
 Until December 26, 2020 there remained for journeys exclusively on the 1st phase of line 5 ( – ) a reduced fare is 2 yuan for journeys under 6 km and all other journeys on the line were 3 yuan. This was not applied once passengers interchange to other lines, e.g. fare for passengers from Xinzhuang to Chunshen Road was 2 Yuan, while fare for passengers from Waihuanlu to Chunshen Road was 3 Yuan.
 During the Expo 2010 in Shanghai riding on the expo line (currently line 13) was free. A valid Expo ticket was needed to ride the line.

Unified fare scheme
 From August 2000 passengers can change between lines 1 and 2 at  without exiting the station. A unified fare scheme was introduced for lines 1 and 2 with a fare of 2 yuan within 6 kilometers, 3 yuan for 6-16 kilometers, and 1 yuan for every additional 6 kilometers (e.g. 4 yuan for more than 16 kilometers).
 In 2003 line 3 implemented the unified fare scheme (though in station interchange to other lines was not yet established).
 On September 15, 2005 the shortest rides increased their fare by 1 yuan from 2 yuan to 3 yuan. This was to relieve the overcrowded metro network (with a daily ridership of 1.3 million people in 2004). After 16 kilometers the fare increases with 1 yuan for every 10 kilometers instead of every 6 kilometers. Therefore, rides longer than 28 kilometers had their prices either remained the same or dropped by 1 or 2 yuan. These price changes were meant to encourage more people to take the bus, particularly during rush hour as about 30% of rush-hour passengers and 38% of the total passengers use the subways for short trips. However, the metro fare increase seems to have had little effect.
 On October 21, 2005, Shanghai Metro lines 1 and 2 fully launched the new "One-Ticket Pass" ticket card.
 In November 2005 the cumulative discount scheme was introduced: a discount scheme of 10% after 70 yuan was introduced to benefit long-distance passengers.
 On December 25 2005, Shanghai Metro realized a "one-ticket transfer" across the entire Shanghai Metro between lines 1, 2, 3, and 5 and avoids the problem of inability to continuously count the journeys due to the second ticket purchase. Shanghai Metro has become the first enterprise in China to realize the network operation of the automatic fare collection system. New line openings from 2005 adopted the unified fare scheme.
 In October 2007 the combined ride discount was introduced: when transferring between air-conditioned bus and Shanghai metro travelers can enjoy 1 yuan discount.
 In April 2009 the combined ride discount was extended to include all bus rides (also non air-conditioned bus rides). The transfer time is extended to 2 hours.
 On 24 April 2010 a one-day pass priced at 18 yuan was introduced for the Expo 2010 held in Shanghai (continued to be offered after Expo 2010).
 On 8 March 2012 a three-day pass priced at 45 yuan was introduced.
 On 26 June 2016 after the implementation of the comprehensive pension system for the elderly, the free transportation for seniors over 70 were abolished. On 1 July 2016 an insurance transportation card, referred to as "Baotong Card" (保通卡) was launched by commercial insurer Pacific Insurance Company for senior Shanghainese with household registration to take free all-day free rides.

References

timeline